This is an incomplete list of Statutory Instruments published in the United Kingdom in the year 2012.

1-100

1101-1200
2012/1199 - The Apprenticeships (Alternative English Completion Conditions) Regulations 2012, made under section 1(5) and 262(3) of the Apprenticeships, Skills, Children and Learning Act 2009. See Apprenticeships#Structure of apprenticeships in 2000s.

3001-4000

SI 2012/3173 - Public Services (Social Value) Act 2012 (Commencement) Order 2012

Notes

External links
Legislation.gov.uk delivered by the UK National Archive
UK SI's on legislation.gov.uk
UK Draft SI's on legislation.gov.uk

See also
List of Statutory Instruments of the United Kingdom

Lists of Statutory Instruments of the United Kingdom
Statutory Instruments
Statutory Instruments